

Season summary
Helsingborg stunned the footballing world when they defeated Italian giants Inter Milan 1-0 on aggregate to become the first Swedish club to reach the Champions League group stages. Unfortunately, Helsingborg's luck ran out in the group stage and they were soundly beaten in their first three matches; they recovered to chalk up respectable draws against Paris Saint-Germain and that season's European champions, Bayern Munich, but finished bottom of their group and failed to even drop down into the UEFA Cup.

First-team squad

Results

Champions League

Second qualifying round

Helsingborg won 3–0 on aggregate.

Third qualifying round

Helsingborg won 1–0 on aggregate.

Group stage

References

Helsingborgs IF seasons
Helsingborgs IF